Jolvis Enrique Sosa Rodríguez (born 17 January 2000) is a Venezuelan footballer who plays as a midfielder for Venezuelan Primera División side Yaracuyanos.

Career

Early years
Sosa's uncles inspired him to want to play football. First his Uncle Gregorio, who he always saw playing with his neighbourhood team. Then Uncle Giancarlo, who motivated him to join his first team, FC San Fernando. “I had already turned 10 when I had my first real training session. That day marked my future. I convinced the coach by scoring a goal and giving several assists,” Sosa revealed in an interview, who until that day had only played football at school and in his backyard.

Deportivo La Guaira
Sosa and FC San Fernando faced Deportivo La Guaira in 2015 and beat them. After the game, La Guaira immediately made contact with Sosa, took him to Carabobo and six months later, he ended up signing with the club.

He played a lot of U20 games for La Guaira, before he got his professional debut for the club in the Venezuelan Primera División against Caracas FC on 23 July 2017, when he came on as a substitute for Juan Carlos Azócar in the 91st minute. This was his first and last official appearance for the club.

In 2018, Sosa was loaned out to Gran Valencia in the Venezuelan second division, allegedly because he was not a part of La Guira's plans. Later in that year, Sosa also attended a Summer Course at Marcet Football Academy in Barcelona, in order to experience first-hand contact with Spanish football.

Monagas
In February 2019, Sosa moved to Monagas. His first game came on 2 September 2019 against Academia Puerto Cabello in the Venezuelan Primera División. In his second game for the club and first game in the starting lineup, against Angostura FC in the Copa Venezuela, he scored his first goal.

Yaracuyanos
On 2 February 2020, Sosa joined fellow league club Yaracuyanos. Sosa played 12 games in his first season at the club.

International career
In 2016, Sosa was summoned in the Venezuelan U17 national team, but a knee injury prevented him from maintaining any sort of continuity with the team.

References

External links
 

Living people
2000 births
Association football midfielders
Venezuelan footballers
Venezuelan Primera División players
Deportivo La Guaira players
Gran Valencia Maracay F.C. players
Monagas S.C. players
Yaracuyanos FC players
People from Apure